Greensburg is an unincorporated community in Berkeley County, West Virginia, United States. It is located northeast of Martinsburg on County Route 5/3.

Unincorporated communities in Berkeley County, West Virginia
Unincorporated communities in West Virginia